DAAS, DaaS or Daas may refer to:

 Data as a Service (DaaS), a model of delivering dynamic data
 Desktop as a service (DaaS): "desktop" virtualization in computing
 Daas (2005 film), an Indian Tamil romantic film
 Daas (2011 film), a Polish film
 Dad's Army Appreciation Society
 The Doug Anthony All Stars (stylized as D⋆A†A☭S), an Australian musical comedy group (1984–1994, 2014–present)
 Ain Arnat Airport (ICAO: DAAS) in Algeria
 The Arabic acronym for Islamic State of Iraq and the Levant
 Dismissive avoidant attachment style

See also
 DASS
 Das